Gość Niedzielny (lit. Sunday Guest) is a Polish weekly Catholic news magazine. It is published in Katowice.

The magazine circulation in 2011 was 198,500 copies. The print and e-edition circulation of the weekly was 136,003 in August 2014.

The magazine was established in 1923 as a newspaper of the Roman Catholic Archdiocese of Katowice.

See also
 List of magazines in Poland

References

External links 
 Official website

1923 establishments in Poland
Magazines established in 1923
Mass media in Katowice
Polish-language magazines
News magazines published in Poland
Weekly magazines published in Poland
Catholic magazines